Łukasz Palkowski (born 2 March 1976, Warsaw) is a Polish film director and screenwriter.

Life and career
He initially studied at the National Film School in Łódź but dropped out. In 2007, he made his first full-length feature film entitled Rezerwat. The film tells the story of a photographer living in the Praga District of Warsaw who becomes infatuated with a local hairdresser and as a result comes into conflict with a criminal who shares a flat with her. He received an award for best debut at the 32nd Gdynia Film Festival. In 2011, he directed Wojna żeńsko-męska based on a novel by Hanna Samson, which received much less favourable reviews from critics.

In 2014, Palkowski directed his most critically acclaimed film Gods starring Tomasz Kot and based on the life of Zbigniew Religa, a surgeon who carried out the first heart transplant in Poland. The film won Grand Prix at the 39th Gdynia Film Festival as well as Polish Film Award for Best Film. In 2017, he directed a biopic Breaking the Limits inspired by the life of triathlete Jerzy Górski. The film received the Audience Award at the Gdynia Film Festival.

He also directed a number of television series including an award-winning crime drama Belfer in 2016. He also directed the first six episodes of Pułapka ("The Trap") TV series in 2018 while in 2019 he directed Żmijowisko based on Wojciech Chmielarz's crime novel.

Filmography
Rezerwat, 2007
39 i pół, TV series, episodes 6-13, 2008
Wojna żeńsko-męska, 2011
Bogowie, 2014
Belfer, TV series 2016
Diagnoza, TV series, 2017
Breaking the Limits, 2017
Pułapka, TV series, 2017
Chyłka. Kasacja, TV series, 2018-2019

Screenplay
Nasza ulica, 2004
Rezerwat, 2007

See also
Polish cinema

References

1976 births
Living people
Polish film directors
Film people from Warsaw